Refuge Duc des Abruzzes à l'Oriondé is a refuge located above Breuil-Cervinia in the Aosta Valley. The refuge lies on the south side of the Matterhorn, at a height of 2,802 metres. It is used for the ascent of the Italian normal route.

Mountain huts in the Alps
Mountain huts in Italy
Matterhorn